Myalla is a locality and small rural community in the local government area of Waratah-Wynyard, in the North West region of Tasmania. The 2016 census determined a population of 54 for the state suburb of Myalla.

History
The locality name is derived from the Aboriginal words Myallanga Bourack, meaning "To Grow". The name has been in use since about 1908.

The community history has been recorded by locals.

Road infrastructure
The C229 route (Myalla Road) runs south from the Bass Highway through the locality and provides access to many other localities.

References

Localities of Waratah–Wynyard Council
Towns in Tasmania